The 1924 Michigan gubernatorial election was held on November 4, 1924. Incumbent Republican Alex J. Groesbeck defeated Democratic nominee Edward Frensdorf with 68.84% of the vote.

General election

Candidates
Major party candidates
Alex J. Groesbeck, Republican
Edward Frensdorf, Democratic 
Other candidates
Faith Johnston, Prohibition
Paul Dinger, Socialist Labor
William L. Krieghoff, Socialist

Results

References

1924
Michigan
Gubernatorial
November 1924 events